Criminal: Spain is a 2019 Spanish-language police procedural anthology series created by George Kay and Jim Field Smith and starring Emma Suárez, Carmen Machi and Álvaro Cervantes. Criminal: Spain is part of Netflix's Criminal, an anthology series consisting of twelve episodes with three episodes each set across four countries filmed in local languages – France, Spain, Germany and the UK.

It was released on 20 September 2019 on Netflix.

Premise
Set within the confines of a police interrogation room, Spanish investigators engage in intense games of psychological cat-and-mouse with their accused suspects to find the answers they need in order to solve their cases.

Cast

Accused
 Carmen Machi - Isabel Ferradas Pérez
 Inma Cuesta - Carmen
 Eduard Fernández - Carmelo Al Huzaini

Police
 José Ángel Egido - Commissioner (Comisario) Joaquin Manero Alted
 Emma Suárez - Chief Inspector (Inspectora Jefe) María de los Ángeles Toranzo Puig
  - Inspector (Inspector) Carlos Cerdeño Varona
 María Morales -  Inspector (Inspectora) Luisa
 Álvaro Cervantes - Sub Inspector (Subinspector) Raimundo Messeguer Ortiz
 Daniel Chamorro - Officer (Oficial de Policía) Jorge
 Milo Taboada - Officer (Oficial de Policía) Leo

Lawyers
 Nuria Mencía - Clara
 Javi Coll - Carmen's lawyer

Episodes

Production
All twelve episodes will film at Netflix's production hub at Ciudad de la Tele in Madrid.

Release
Criminal: Spain was released on 20 September 2019 on Netflix.

References

External links
 
 

Spanish-language Netflix original programming
Television shows set in Spain
Television shows filmed in Spain
2010s drama television series
2019 Spanish television series debuts